Margaret Wander Bonanno (February 7, 1950 – April 6, 2021) was an American science fiction writer, ghost writer, and small press publisher. She wrote seven Star Trek novels, science fiction novels (including The Others series and the Preternatural series), a collaborative novel with Nichelle Nichols, a biography, and other works.

Biography 
Bonanno was born in Brooklyn, New York. Her first novel, the feminist A Certain Slant of Light, was published by Seaview Books in 1979.

After two well-received Star Trek novels, Dwellers in the Crucible (1985) and Strangers from the Sky (1985), Bonanno's next novel, ultimately titled Probe, was the victim of changes in the franchise. With the debut of Star Trek: The Next Generation (1987), Paramount took a closer role in supervising the books, disallowing story elements that were said to conflict with Gene Roddenberry's idea of Star Trek. Instead of being rejected, Probe was heavily edited and ultimately mostly written by Gene DeWeese. Bonanno said that Probe contained only "seven percent" of her original material.

Bonanno's public disavowal of the book included her sharing her original manuscript Music of the Spheres at Star Trek conventions. This led to Bonanno being blacklisted from the Star Trek publishing universe for over 11 years; in 2003 she returned with Catalyst of Sorrows, part of the Star Trek: The Lost Era series.

Bonanno was a member of TrekNation and posted regularly on the Trek BBS.

Her novel Preternatural was a 1997 New York Times Notable Book. Preternatural3, a sequel, was a 2002 New York Times Notable Book.

Bonanno, who had lived in the Los Angeles area, died on April 6, 2021 at age of 71.

Bibliography

Star Trek novels
Dwellers in the Crucible (Pocket Books, 1985) 
Strangers from the Sky (Pocket Books, 1987) 
Music of the Spheres (1990) — Bonanno's unapproved version of Probe, never officially published
Probe (Pocket Books, 1992)  — mostly written by Gene DeWeese; contains only seven percent of Music of the Spheres
Catalyst of Sorrows (Star Trek, 2003)  — Part of the Star Trek: The Lost Era series.
Burning Dreams (Gallery Books, 2006)  — Featuring Christopher Pike. 
Its Hour Come Round (Pocket Books/Star Trek, 2007).  — An e-book novella, sixth book in the Mere Anarchy series.
Unspoken Truth (Pocket Books/Star Trek, 2010)  — Dealt with Saavik's origins as a feral child

Other science fiction

 Saturn's Child (Putnam Adult, 1996) with Nichelle Nichols 
 Ailuranth (Bowker, 2018)

Others series 
The Others (St. Martin's Press, 1990) 
OtherWhere (St. Martin's Press, 1991) 
OtherWise (St. Martin's Press, 1993) ISBN 978-0312093587

Preternatural series 
Preternatural (Tor Books, 1997) 
Preternatural Too: Gyre (Tor Books, 2001) 
Preternatural3 (Tor Books, 2002)

Mainstream fiction
A Certain Slant of Light (Seaview Books, 1979) 
Ember Days (Seaview Books, 1980) 
Callbacks (Seaview Books, 1981) 
Risks (St. Martin's Press, 1989) 
Ain't Exactly Clear (Van Wander Press, 2016)

Children's books
Destination Mars (Zebra Books, 1991) as by Rick North (part of the Young Astronauts series) 
Citizens of Mars (Zebra Books, 1991) as by Rick North (part of the Young Astronauts series)

Nonfiction
Angela Lansbury: A Biography (St. Martin's Press, 1987)

References

External links
Official website 

Review of Preternatural, SF Site
Review of Preternatual Too: Gyre, SF Site

Interviews 
Trek Nation (Aug. 2006)
SFF World Oct. 2, 2000

1950 births
2021 deaths
American science fiction writers
Writers from New York City
People from Greater Los Angeles
20th-century American novelists
21st-century American novelists
20th-century American women writers
21st-century American women writers
Women science fiction and fantasy writers
American women novelists
20th-century American biographers
American women biographers
21st-century American biographers
Novelists from New York (state)
Historians from New York (state)